"Anywhere with You" is a song recorded by American country music artist Jake Owen. It was released in February 2013 as the fourth single from his third studio album, Barefoot Blue Jean Night. The song was written by Ben Hayslip, David Lee Murphy and Jimmy Yeary.

Reception

Critical
Billy Dukes of Taste of Country gave the song two stars out of five, calling it "a song we’ve all heard a dozen times before, served with generic country seasoning." Chuck Dauphin of Roughstock gave the song a favorable review, writing that "it’s a performance that is ready to hit the airwaves. The chorus is particularly hooky!" Ben Foster of Country Universe gave the song a C− grade, saying that it "takes a concept many times used before, and does nothing with it" and "the thick, un-country, radio-chasing production similarly earns no points for originality."

Commercial
As of December 14, 2014, "Anywhere with You" has sold over 1,000,000 copies in the United States.

Chart performance
"Anywhere with You" debuted at number 53 on the U.S. Billboard Country Airplay chart for the week of January 19, 2013. It also debuted at number 47 on the U.S. Billboard Hot Country Songs chart for the week of February 9, 2013. It also debuted at number 92 on the U.S. Billboard Hot 100 chart for the week of April 6, 2013. It also debuted at number 97 on the Canadian Hot 100 chart for the week of June 1, 2013.

Year-end charts

Certifications

References

2013 singles
Jake Owen songs
Songs written by Ben Hayslip
Songs written by David Lee Murphy
Songs written by Jimmy Yeary
RCA Records Nashville singles
2011 songs
Song recordings produced by Joey Moi